Werner Gitt (born 22 February 1937) is a German engineer and young earth creationist. Before retirement, he was Head of the Department of Information Technology at Physikalisch-Technische Bundesanstalt.

Biography 

Gitt was born in Stallupönen, East Prussia. He became an engineering professor at the Physikalisch-Technische Bundesanstalt, Germany's national institute for natural and engineering sciences. By the 1990s he was assuming a leadership role in the German creationist movement, through the publication of several influential creationist books. He was one of the leaders of the nondenominational Wort und Wissen (Word and Knowledge) society, the largest creationist society in Germany. He has written articles for a creationist apologetics web site.

Works 
 1992 Questions - that always get asked (Fragen - die immer wieder gestellt werden)
 1993 Did God use Evolution? (Schuf Gott durch Evolution?)
 1993 Signals from Space - Why are there Stars? (Signale aus dem All - Wozu gibt es Sterne?)
 1994 If Animals Could Talk (Wenn Tiere reden könnten)
 1997 In the Beginning was Information (Am Anfang war die Information)
 1999 The Wonder of Man
 2000 In the Beginning was the Big Bang? (Am Anfang war der Urknall?)
 2001 Time And Eternity (Zeit und Ewigkeit)

References

Bibliography

External links 
 Werner Gitt's web site
 Biography from Answers in Genesis
 Information Theory and Creationism: Werner Gitt at the TalkOrigins Archive

1937 births
Living people
Christian creationists
Baptists from Germany
People from East Prussia
University of Hanover alumni
People from Nesterov